Francheville is a former commune in the Eure department in the Normandy region in northern France. On 1 January 2017, it was merged into the new commune Verneuil d'Avre et d'Iton.

Population

See also
Communes of the Eure department

References

External links

Official site

Former communes of Eure